Damian Grabowski (born May 12, 1980) is a Polish mixed martial artist who last competed in 2019. A professional since 2007, he has fought in the UFC, Bellator, Konfrontacja Sztuk Walki (KSW), and M-1 Global.

Biography
Grabowski is a multiple Brazilian Jiu-Jitsu champion of Poland, Vice Champion of the World and European Champion.

Mixed martial arts career

European career
Grabowski defeated Kiril Handzhiyski at FX3 on June 13, 2009 in London (a last-minute replacement for Gary Rawlings).

Grabowski was then scheduled to fight PRIDE veteran Valentijn Overeem at a Beast of the East event in November in Gdynia, Poland and also Thorsten Kronz (known from Team Germany on M-1) on December 5 in Darmstadt, Germany on Mix Fight Gala IX. Damian sustained a shoulder injury during training just a few days before the Overeem fight and had to drop out of both bouts.

Grabowski then returned in 2008 with a first-round armbar win against Dion Staring and then fought in June against Michał Kita to determine the best heavyweight fighter in Poland. After connecting with a powerful upkick that cut the eyebrow of Kita, who slipped and fell out of the ring, Grabowski was declared the winner by doctor stoppage due to a heavily swollen eye.

Grabowski won bouts with Stav Economou at MMA Attack 3, with Tadas Rimkevicius at M-1 Challenge 39, and with Kenny Garner at M-1 Challenge 44: Battle of Kulikovo. The last one was for the M-1 Heavyweight Championship.

During M-1 Challenge 50 (August 15, 2014), Grabowski fought against his friend, also the Polish fighter, unbeaten Marcin Tybura. Tybura managed to take Grabowski down early in the first round and won the fight by mean of the north–south choke. Surprised, Grabowski didn't spare the compliments for Tybura after the fight, as the championship belt left in Poland.

Bellator
MMAROCKS.PL first announced in 2010 that Grabowski signed a contract with the American promotion Bellator and would compete in their heavyweight tournament at Bellator 25 on August 2010. His opponent in the first round was Scott Barrett. Grabowski won the fight via unanimous decision.  He was expected to face Neil Grove in the semi-finals, but instead faced Cole Konrad. His thirteen-fight winning streak was snapped, as he lost the fight via unanimous decision, being unable to stop the takedowns of Konrad, the future winner of the tournament.

After defeating Joaquim Ferreira and Eddie Sanchez for the MMA Attack promotion, Grabowski fought one more time in Bellator in  May 2012 where he defeated Dave Huckaba at Bellator 67.

Ultimate Fighting Championship
After amassing a record of 20 wins against 2 losses, Grabowski was signed by the UFC to a contract.  He debuted against Derrick Lewis on February 6, 2016, at UFC Fight Night 82.  He lost the fight via TKO in the first round.

Grabowski faced Anthony Hamilton on July 30, 2016, at UFC 201. He lost the fight via knockout in the first round.

Grabowski was expected to face Viktor Pešta on January 15, 2017, at UFC Fight Night 103. However, Grabowski was removed from the bout on December 21 for undisclosed reasons and was replaced by Alexey Oleynik.

Grabowski was expected to face Christian Colombo on May 28, 2017, at UFC Fight Night 109. However, the pairing was scrapped as both fighters sustained injuries in the weeks leading up to the event. The pairing was left intact and was rescheduled for July 22, 2017 at UFC on Fox 25. Subsequently, Colombo was removed from the fight on June 22 for undisclosed reasons and was replaced by Chase Sherman. Grabowski lost the fight by unanimous decision.

On August 14, 2018, it was announced that Grabowski was released from UFC.

KSW
After knocking out Karol Bedorf to start his stint in KSW, Grabowski was expected to challenge Phil De Fries for the KSW Heavyweight Championship at KSW 50 on September 14, 2019. However, Grabowski was forced to withdraw from the bout due to an injury.

Championships and accomplishments
Bellator Fighting Championships
Bellator Season 3 Heavyweight Tournament Semifinalist
Ultimate Cage Fighters Championship
UCFC 2009 Heavyweight Tournament Winner
M-1 Global
M-1 2013 Heavyweight Champion

Mixed martial arts record

|-
|Win
|align=center|22–5 
|Karol Bedorf
|TKO (punches)
|KSW 49: Soldić vs. Kaszubowski
|
|align=center|2 
|align=center|3:56 
|Gdańsk/Sopot, Poland
|
|-
|Win
|align=center|21–5
|Jose Rodrigo Guelke
|TKO (punches)
|FEN 22: Poznań Fight Night
|
|align=center|1
|align=center|3:21
|Poznań, Poland
|
|-
|Loss
|align=center|20–5
|Chase Sherman
|Decision (unanimous)
|UFC on Fox: Weidman vs. Gastelum 
|
|align=center|3
|align=center|5:00
|Uniondale, New York, United States
|
|-
|Loss
|align=center|20–4
|Anthony Hamilton
|KO (punches)
|UFC 201 
|
|align=center|1
|align=center|0:14
|Atlanta, Georgia, United States
|
|-
|Loss
|align=center|20–3
|Derrick Lewis
|TKO (punches)
|UFC Fight Night: Hendricks vs. Thompson
|
|align=center|1
|align=center|2:17
|Las Vegas, Nevada, United States
|
|-
|Win
|align=center|20–2
|Konstantin Gluhov 
|Submission (arm-triangle choke)
|M-1 Challenge 53: Battle in the Celestial Empire
|
|align=center|3
|align=center|1:47
|Beijing, China
|
|-
|Loss
|align=center|19–2
|Marcin Tybura
|Technical Submission (north-south choke)
|M-1 Challenge 50: Battle on Neva
|
|align=center|1
|align=center|1:28
|St. Petersburg, Russia
|
|-
|Win
|align=center|19–1
|Kenny Garner
|Submission (arm-triangle choke)
|M-1 Challenge 44: Battle Of Kulikovo
|
|align=center|3
|align=center|2:30
|Tula, Russia
|
|-
|Win
|align=center|18–1
|Tadas Rimkevicius
|TKO (punches)
|M-1 Challenge 39
|
|align=center|2
|align=center|3:28
|Moscow, Russia
|
|-
|Win
|align=center|17–1
|Stav Economou
|Decision (split)
|MMA Attack 3
|
|align=center|3
|align=center|5:00
|Katowice, Poland
|
|-
|Win
|align=center|16–1
|Dave Huckaba
|Decision (unanimous)
|Bellator 67
|
|align=center|3
|align=center|5:00
|Rama, Ontario, Canada
|
|-
|Win
|align=center|15–1
|Eddie Sanchez
|Submission (kimura)
|MMA Attack 2
|
|align=center|2
|align=center|2:02
|Katowice, Poland
|
|-
|Win
|align=center|14–1
|Joaquim Ferreira
|Submission (guillotine choke)
|MMA Attack
|
|align=center|1
|align=center|2:57
|Warsaw, Poland
|
|-
|Loss
|align=center|13–1
|Cole Konrad
|Decision (unanimous)
|Bellator 29
|
|align=center|3
|align=center|5:00
|Milwaukee, Wisconsin, United States
| 
|-
|Win
|align=center|13–0
|Scott Barrett
|Decision (unanimous)
|Bellator 25
|
|align=center|3
|align=center|5:00
|Chicago, Illinois, United States
|
|-
|Win
|align=center|12–0
|Michał Kita
|TKO (doctor stoppage)
|BOTE: Grabowski vs. Kita
|
|align=center|1
|align=center|3:25
|Gdynia, Poland
|
|-
|Win
|align=center|11–0
|Dion Staring
|Submission (armbar)
|BOTE: Chahbari vs. Souwer
|
|align=center|2
|align=center|2:44
|Zutphen, Netherlands
|
|-
|Win
|align=center|10–0
|Kiril Handzhiyski
|Submission (rear-naked choke)
|FX3: Rough Justice
|
|align=center|1
|align=center|1:27
|London, England
|
|-
|Win
|align=center|9–0
|Miodrag Petković
|Submission (rear-naked choke)
|UCFC: 20,000 Dollar Tournament
|
|align=center|2
|align=center|3:48
|Vienna, Austria
|
|-
|Win
|align=center|8–0
|Lincon Rodrigues
|Submission (kimura)
|UCFC: 20,000 Dollar Tournament
|
|align=center|1
|align=center|2:24
|Vienna, Austria
|
|-
|Win
|align=center|7–0
|Martinsh Egle
|TKO (punches)
|UCFC: 20,000 Dollar Tournament
|
|align=center|1
|align=center|0:29
|Vienna, Austria
|
|-
|Win
|align=center|6–0
|Elvedin Tukić
|TKO (punches)
|UCFC: 20,000 Dollar Tournament
|
|align=center|1
|align=center|1:24
|Vienna, Austria
|
|-
|Win
|align=center|5–0
|Martin Čermák
|TKO (submission to punches)
|Pro Fight 3
|
|align=center|1
|align=center|1:02
|Olsztyn, Poland
|
|-
|Win
|align=center|4–0
|Deividas Banalities
|Submission (arm-triangle choke)
|Bushido Lithuania: Hero's 2008
|
|align=center|2
|align=center|1:52
|Vilnius, Lithuania
|
|-
|Win
|align=center|3–0
|Dion Staring
|Submission (armbar)
|Fight Sensation 3
|
|align=center|1
|align=center|N/A
|Doetinchem, Netherlands
|
|-
|Win
|align=center|2–0
|Ireneusz Cholewa
|TKO (punches)
|Mielnie Gala
|
|align=center|1
|align=center|N/A
|Mielno, Poland
|
|-
|Win
|align=center|1–0
|Paweł Kubiak
|TKO (doctor stoppage)
|Gladiator's Series
|
|align=center|1
|align=center|1:33
|Tychy, Poland
|

See also
 List of male mixed martial artists

References

External links
 
 

1980 births
Living people
Polish male mixed martial artists
Heavyweight mixed martial artists
Mixed martial artists utilizing Brazilian jiu-jitsu
Polish practitioners of Brazilian jiu-jitsu
Sportspeople from Opole
Ultimate Fighting Championship male fighters